Clara Jecks (22 September 1854 – 5 January 1951) was an English musical comedy performer, best known for soubrette and boy roles.

Early life
Clara Jecks was born in London, the daughter of Charles Jecks and Harriet Martha Coveney. Her father was an actor and theatrical manager, and her mother was an actress. She began appearing on the stage from a very early age, and was trained for a career in entertainment.

Career
Jecks specialized in soubrette and boy roles, saying "I am never so really happy as when acting a lad." She made her first professional appearance on the London stage in 1873, in the show Kissi Kissi. She toured with her mother in the Comedy Opera Company in 1878 in several roles, in The Sorcerer, Trial by Jury, and Breaking the Spell. Other of her many stage appearances included Formosa (1877), Maid of Croissey (1880), The Sleepwalker (1893), The Black Domino (1893), The Middy Ashore, The Member for Slocum, Stage Struck, Santa Claus, Gentleman Joe (1895), A Merry Madcap (1896), Cinderella (1893-1894), Harlequinade and Justice Nell (1900), and her final London appearance, in The Critic (1911).

Personal life
Clara Jecks died in 1951, aged 96 years.

References

External links
 An 1892 photograph of Clara Jecks by Alfred Ellis, in the National Portrait Gallery (London).

1857 births
1951 deaths
English actresses